Fritz S. Brennecke (August 28, 1911 – September 23, 1996) was an American football player and coach. He served as the head football coach at the Colorado School of Mines in Golden, Colorado from 1947 to 1968, compiling a record of 78–113–8. Brennecke played college football at Colorado Agricultural College (now known as Colorado State University) in Fort Collins, Colorado from 1932 to 1934. After graduating, he served as a high school football coach at several locations in Colorado.

References

1911 births
1996 deaths
Colorado State Rams football players
Colorado Mines Orediggers football coaches
High school football coaches in Colorado
Players of American football from Montana